Umberto Merlin (1885–1964) was an Italian lawyer and Christian Democrat politician who held several cabinet posts in the 1940s and 1950s.

Early life and education
Merlin was born in Rovigo on 17 February 1885. He was president of the Catholic Youth Club of St. Francis Association. In 1903 he became the Veneto regional president of the Association. In 1906 he obtained a degree in law from the University of Padua.

Career
Following his graduation Merlin worked as a lawyer. He participated in World War I with the rank of lieutenant. He was a cofounder the Italian Popular Party, but during the Fascist rule he did not involve in politics. After World War II Merlin resumed his political activities and joined the Christian Democracy Party. He was elected as one of the 60 national councilors of the Christian Democrats in the congress held in Rome on 24-27 April 1946. The same year he was elected deputy to the Constituent Assembly. In 1947 Merlin was named as the general secretary of the party. In 1948 he became a senator and served in the first four legislatures. He served as the minister of posts and telecommunications in the cabinet led by Alcide De Gasperi between 31 May 1947 and 23 May 1948. He also served in the same post in the cabinet headed again by Alcide De Gasperi from 16 July to 16 August 1953. He was the minister of public works in the cabinet led by Giuseppe Pella (17 August 1953–17 January 1954) and in the first cabinet of Amintore Fanfani (18 January–9 February 1954). Then he served in the municipal and provincial council of Polesine.

Personal life and death
Merlin married Maria Vittoria Lorenzoni with whom he had four children. He died of a heart attack in Padua on 22 May 1964.

References

External links

20th-century Italian lawyers
1885 births
1964 deaths
Christian Democracy (Italy) politicians
Deputies of Legislature I of Italy
Italian military personnel of World War I
Italian Ministers of Public Works
Italian People's Party (1919) politicians
Italian political party founders
Senators of Legislature I of Italy
Senators of Legislature II of Italy
Senators of Legislature III of Italy
Senators of Legislature IV of Italy
People from Rovigo
Transport ministers of Italy
University of Padua alumni